Cass County is the name of nine counties in the United States; eight of which are named for Michigan governor, senator and presidential candidate Lewis Cass:

Cass County, Illinois 
Cass County, Indiana 
Cass County, Iowa 
Cass County, Michigan 
Cass County, Minnesota 
Cass County, Missouri 
Cass County, Nebraska 
Cass County, North Dakota (named for George Washington Cass)
Cass County, Texas 

Other
Bartow County, Georgia was formerly called Cass County
Cass County (album), an album by Don Henley